Mary Cleo Tarlarini (1878–1954) was an Italian stage and film actress.

Selected filmography
 Jacobo Ortis (1916)
 The Ship (1921)
 The Redemption (1924)
 La donna perduta (1940)

References

Bibliography
 Wilcox, Vanda. Italy in the Era of the Great War. BRILL, 2018.

External links

1878 births
1954 deaths
Italian stage actresses
Italian film actresses
Actresses from Milan
20th-century Italian actresses